Brandywine Bay is a planned community and census-designated place (CDP) in Carteret County, North Carolina, United States. It was first listed as a CDP in the 2020 census with a population of 1,153.

The community is in west-central Carteret County, bordered to the east by Morehead City. U.S. Route 70 forms the northern edge of the CDP, and North Carolina Highway 24 forms the southern edge. The two highway lead east into Morehead City; in the other direction, US-70 leads northwest  to New Bern, while NC-24 leads west  to Cape Carteret.

Demographics

2020 census

Note: the US Census treats Hispanic/Latino as an ethnic category. This table excludes Latinos from the racial categories and assigns them to a separate category. Hispanics/Latinos can be of any race.

References 

Census-designated places in Carteret County, North Carolina
Census-designated places in North Carolina